The Slickee Boys were a Washington, D.C. area punk-psychedelic-garage rock band whose most-remembered lineup consisted of guitarist Marshall Keith, guitarist Kim Kane, singer Mark Noone and drummer Dan Palenski. The group was named after a GI slang term for the rockabilly-inspired Korean street toughs who sold black market goods to American soldiers.

History
The band was founded in 1976 by guitarists Kim Kane and Marshall Keith, with Kane as principal songwriter, and featured Martha Hull on vocals.  The band released its first EP, Hot and Cool, that same year. Separated Vegetables, the group's full-length debut, followed in 1977, but Kane disliked the album's sound to such a degree that he limited the initial pressing to 100 copies.

In 1978, Mark Noone replaced Hull as the singer, with the band reimagining itself through both Noone's showmanship and songwriting. In 1983, a music video for their song "When I Go to the Beach" placed second in MTV's Basement Tapes competition.

In 1988 after a short European Tour, founding member Kim Kane departed to focus on his band Date Bait. The band soldiered on with long-time roadie, John Hansen, taking over on rhythm guitar until they called it quits in 1991.

They hold the record for the most performances at 9:30 Club – 81 shows.

Other work
In the mid 1980s, The Slickee Boys formed their alter ego rockabilly band, The Wanktones. At some venues, including the now-defunct DC club The Wax Museum, The Wanktones "opened" for The Slickee Boys. On their first album released as The Wanktones, "Have a Ball Y'all", the members are listed under the following pseudonyms: Del Marva, Bo Link, Mo Sloe, Ersel Wank, Floyd Glen Bernie, and Elmer Preslee.  "Live At The Fontana Bowlarama" was the second album by Wanktones; released in 1999.

In 1977, four members of the Slickee Boys contributed to the debut album "Music to Kill By," by the Afrika Korps.

Awards
They've won several "Wammie" awards from the Washington Area Music Association.
 1985 – Record (Single/EP) of the Year, "When I Go to the Beach"
 1985 – Video of the Year, "When I Go to the Beach"
 1986 – Rock/Pop Artist/Group of the Year
 2002 – Rock Recording of the Year, Somewhat of an Anthology
In 1989 the band was inducted into the WAMA Hall of Fame

Reunion shows
Starting shortly after the break-up, reunion shows took place most years usually the week between Christmas and New Years, with one show each in Baltimore and D.C. Frequently the line-up changes during the course of the show, with band members taking turns playing on different songs. There have been no reunion shows in the past few years.

Members
John Chumbris – Bass guitar
Giles Cook – Drums
John Hansen – Rhythm guitar
Martha Hull – Lead vocals
Kim Kane – Rhythm guitar
Thomas Kane – Bass guitar
Marshall Keith – Lead guitar, keyboards
Mike Maxwell – Bass guitar
Mark Noone – Lead vocals
Emery Olexa – Bass guitar
Dan Palenski – Drums
Chris Rounds – Drums
Andy von Brand – Bass guitar
Howard Wuelfling – Bass guitar

Discography

7" vinyl
Hot and Cool – EP, Dacoit, 1976
Mersey, Mersey Me – EP, Limp, 1978
3rd EP – EP, Limp, 1979
"The Brain That Refused to Die" – single, Dacoit, 1980
"Here to Stay" – single, Dacoit, 1981
"When I Go to the Beach" – single, Dacoit, 1983
"When I Go to the Beach" – single, Twin/Tone, 1983
"When I Go to the Beach" – single, New Rose, 1984
"Your Autumn Eyes" – single, New Rose, 1987
10th Anniversary EP – EP, Dacoit/D.S.I., 1987
"This Party Sucks" – single, New Rose, 1988
"Long Way to Go" – single, Dacoit, 1995

Full-length albums
Separated Vegetables, 1977
Here to Stay, 1982
Cybernetic Dreams of Pi, 1983
Uh Oh… No Breaks!, 1985
Fashionably Late, 1988
Live at Last, 1989
Somewhat of an Anthology, 2002
A Postcard from the Day CD, 2006

Compilation albums
30 Seconds Over D.C. – LP, Limp, 1978 – Attitude
The Best of Limp (…Rest of Limp) – LP, Limp, 1980
Battle of the Garages – LP, Voxx, 1981
Battle of the Garages – LP, Line, 1981
Newlines Vol.2 – LP, Line, 1981
Connected – LP, Limp, 1981 – Disconnected and Can't Believe
Han-O-Disc – LP, D.I.Y., 1982
The Rebel Kind – LP, Sounds Interesting (United States), 1983
The Rebel Kind – LP, Lolita (France), 1983
Hi-Muck – CS, 1983 – interview and Nagasaki Neuter (live)
The Train to Disaster – LP, Bonafide, 1983
The Train to Disaster – LP, L.S.D., 1983
Midnight Christmas Mess Again – LP, Midnight, 1986
Play New Rose for Me – 2xLP, New Rose, 1986
Laserock'n'rollparty Vol.1 – CD, New Rose, 1987
Every Day Is a Holly Day – 2x10", CD, New Rose, 1988
Every Day Is a Holly Day – CD, Giant, 1988
Laserock'n'rollparty Vol.2 – CD, New Rose, 1989
New Rose Story – 4xCD, Last Call, 2000
Stories of the Dogs – Songs for Dominique – 2xCD, Lollipop, 2006 – Death Lane
Counter Culture 1976 – CD, Rough Trade, 2007 – Psychodaisies
Vindicated! A Tribute to the Fleshtones – CD, Dirty Water Records/LP, Larsen, 2007

Other
 "Long Way to Go" – 6" flexidisc, Gorilla Beat, 1982

In popular culture
In 1987 the film Back to the Beach used the song "When I Go to the Beach" during the bar scene with Bob Denver.  It is not included in the soundtrack released on CBS Records.

References

External links
 music videos for "When I Go to the Beach" and "Gotta Tell Me Why"

American garage rock groups
American psychedelic rock music groups
Punk rock groups from Washington, D.C.